Callidula nenia is a moth in the family Callidulidae first described by Herbert Druce in 1888. It is found on the Solomon Islands.

References

Callidulidae
Moths described in 1888